Ben Qadir Abou Ouattara (born 25 December 1999) is a Burkinabé international footballer who plays for Moldovan club Sheriff Tiraspol, as a right winger.

Club career
He played for Salitas, Horoya AC and KV Mechelen. In January 2019 he moved on loan to Lille B for six months, with an option to buy.

On 22 July 2021, he signed a three-year contract with Ligue 2 club Valenciennes.

On 20 June 2022, Sheriff Tiraspol announced the signing of Ouattara.

International career
He made his international debut for Burkina Faso in 2018.

References

1999 births
People from Bouaké
Living people
Burkinabé footballers
Association football wingers
Burkina Faso international footballers
Salitas FC players
Horoya AC players
K.V. Mechelen players
Lille OSC players
Vitória S.C. players
Vitória S.C. B players
Amiens SC players
Valenciennes FC players
Belgian Pro League players
Ligue 1 players
Ligue 2 players
Primeira Liga players
Burkinabé expatriate footballers
Burkinabé expatriate sportspeople in Guinea
Expatriate footballers in Guinea
Burkinabé expatriate sportspeople in Belgium
Expatriate footballers in Belgium
Burkinabé expatriate sportspeople in France
Expatriate footballers in France
Burkinabé expatriate sportspeople in Portugal
Expatriate footballers in Portugal
21st-century Burkinabé people
FC Sheriff Tiraspol players
Burkinabé expatriate sportspeople in Moldova
Expatriate footballers in Moldova